King Robert may refer to:

People
 Robert I of France (c.866–923), King of France
 Robert II of France (972–1031), King of France
 Robert I of Scotland (1274–1329), known as Robert the Bruce, King of Scotland
 Robert II of Scotland (1316–1390), King of Scotland
 Robert III of Scotland (c. 1337–1406), King of Scotland
 Robert, King of Naples (1276–1343), known as Robert the Wise, King of Naples
 Rupprecht, Crown Prince of Bavaria (1869–1955), claimed successor to the thrones of England and Scotland as Robert I and IV

Fictional characters
 Robert Baratheon, the fictional King of Westeros in George R. R. Martin's A Song of Ice and Fire series

See also
 Prince Robert (disambiguation)